Kenneth Walter Oxenford Coulson (1910–1987) was an English international lawn bowler.

Bowls career
Coulson became the first British singles champion after winning the British Isles Bowls Championships in 1959, when bowling for England and the Croydon Bowls Club. He qualified for the event by virtue of winning the English singles crown the previous year. He was a motor car salesman by trade and was first capped by England in 1955.

References

1910 births
1987 deaths
English male bowls players